This is a list of diplomatic missions in the Central African Republic.  At present, the capital city of Bangui hosts 14 embassies (not including honorary consulates).

Embassies 
Bangui

Consulate 
Bouar

Other posts in Bangui 
 (Consulate-General)
 (Delegation)

Non-resident embassies 

 (Brazzaville)
 (Abuja)  
 (Addis Ababa)
 (Abuja) 
 (Abuja)
 (Yaoundé) 
 (Brazzaville)
 (Yaoundé) 
 (Abuja)
 (Paris)
 (Brazzaville) 
 (Abuja) 
 (Brazzaville) 
 (Yaoundé)
 (Abuja)
 (Yaoundé) 
 (Abuja)
 (Kinshasa) 
 (Abuja)
 (Kinshasa) 
 (Yaoundé) 
 (Abuja)
 (Yaoundé) 
 (Brazzaville) 
 (Yaoundé) 
 (Khartoum)
 (Abuja)
 (Abuja)
 (Riyadh)
 (Yaounde)
 (Abuja)
 (Abuja)
 (Abuja)
 (Riyadh)
 (Libreville)
 (New York City)
 (New York City)
 (Khartoum)
 (Khartoum)
 (N'Djamena)
 (Brazzaville) 
 (Abuja)
 (Paris)
 (Luanda)
 (Pretoria)
 (Paris)
 (Khartoum)
 (N'Djamena)
 (Abuja)
 (New York City) 
 (Abuja)
 (Addis Ababa)
 (Yaoundé) 
 (Yaoundé) 
 (Juba)
 (Yaoundé) 
 (Kinshasa)
 (Yaoundé) 
 (Kinshasa) 
 (Abuja)
 (Abuja)
 (Yaoundé) 
 (Kinshasa) 
 (N'Djamena)
 (Yaoundé) 
 (Kinshasa)
 (New York City)
 (Abuja)
 (Khartoum)

Former Embassy

Notes

References

Other links
 Embassy Finder

Diplomatic missions
Diplomatic missions
Central African Republic